The Intercollegiate Studies Institute (ISI) is a nonprofit educational organization that promotes conservative thought on college campuses. 

It was founded in 1953 by Frank Chodorov with William F. Buckley Jr. as its first president. It sponsors lectures and debates on college campuses, publishes books and journals, provides funding and editorial assistance to a network of conservative and libertarian college newspapers, and finances graduate fellowships.

History
In 1953, Frank Chodorov founded ISI as the Intercollegiate Society of Individualists, with a young Yale University graduate William F. Buckley Jr. as president. E. Victor Milione, ISI's next and longest-serving president, established publications, a membership network, a lecture and conference program, and a graduate fellowship program.

ISI has been teaching various forms of intellectual conservatism on college campuses ever since.

Past ISI president and former Reagan administration official T. Kenneth Cribb led the institute from 1989 until 2011, when Christopher G. Long took over. Cribb is credited with expanding ISI's revenue from one million dollars that year to $13,636,005 in 2005. John A. Burtka IV became president of ISI in September 2020.

ISI lists its core beliefs as limited government, individual liberty, personal responsibility, the rule of law, free-market economics, and traditional Judeo-Christian values.

Programs and activities

ISI runs a number of programs on college campuses, including student societies and student papers. It publishes a series of "Student's Guide to..." books, such as A Student's Guide to Liberal Learning. It hosts conferences and other events featuring conservative speakers and academics, and provides funding for students to attend. In this funding capacity ISI is affiliated with the Liberty Fund.

ISI administers the Collegiate Network, which provides editorial and financial outreach to conservative and libertarian student journalists.

Publications
Periodicals issued by ISI include:
The Intercollegiate Review
The Academic Reviewer
The Political Science Reviewer

In the fall of 2006, ISI published the findings of its survey of the teaching of America's history and institutions in higher education. The Institute reported, as the title suggests, that there is a "coming crisis in citizenship."

ISI Books
Intercollegiate Studies Institute operates ISI Books, which publishes books on conservative issues and distributes a number of books from other publishers. Its focus is largely on the humanities and the foundations of Western culture, and perceived challenges from left-wing progressivism. In the summer of 2005, ISI Books published It Takes a Family: Conservatism and the Common Good, by Pennsylvania Republican Senator Rick Santorum. The book premiered at #13 on the New York Times Best Seller list. Passages from it generated controversy during Santorum's 2006 reelection campaign and his 2012 presidential campaign. In 2023, ISI Books was acquired by Regnery Publishing.

See also

 Collegiate Network
 Traditionalist conservatism
 Students for Academic Freedom

References

External links
 

Conservative organizations in the United States
Political organizations based in the United States
Student political organizations in the United States
Regnery family
Paleoconservative organizations
Student organizations established in 1953
1953 establishments in the United States